Thomas Atkins (born c. 1538) was an English mercer and holder of public offices during the reign of Elizabeth I.

He was the eldest son of John Atkins of Ashleworth, Gloucestershire and educated at Brasenose College, Oxford, where he was awarded BA in 1554. He studied law at the Middle Temple (1558).
 
He was the Member of Parliament for Gloucester from 1571 to 1593.

He never married.

References

Year of birth unknown
Year of death unknown
Alumni of Brasenose College, Oxford
Members of the Middle Temple
Members of the Parliament of England (pre-1707) for Gloucester
English MPs 1571
English MPs 1572–1583
English MPs 1584–1585
English MPs 1586–1587
English MPs 1589
English MPs 1593